Arthur Donaldson Smith (1866–1939) was an American physician, hunter, and explorer of Africa. In the 1890s he made a geological expedition to Lake Rudolph (now Lake Turkana), passing through what was then Somaliland, southern Ethiopia and Kenya. In order to visit Ethiopia, he had to get permission from Menelik II. The trip lasted 18 months and took place between 1894 and 1895. In 1897 he published a book about his trip called, Through Unknown African Countries: the First Expedition from Somaliland to Lake Rudolf.

In 1895 three new species of reptiles endemic to the Horn of Africa were named in his honor by Belgian-British herpetologist George Albert Boulenger: Zamenis smithi (now Platyceps brevis smithi), Hemidactylus smithi, and Pseuderemias smithii.

He is interred at Laurel Hill Cemetery in Philadelphia.

References

External links

Through Unknown African Countries: the First Expedition from Somaliland to Lake Rudolf (London: 1897) (PDF file)

1866 births
1939 deaths
Explorers of Africa
Recipients of the Cullum Geographical Medal